Maksim Sergeyevich Sedov (born 2 July 2000) is a Russian football player. He plays for FC Amkar Perm.

Club career
He made his debut in the Russian Football National League for FC Fakel Voronezh on 1 August 2020 in a game against FC Akron Tolyatti, he substituted Pavel Yakovlev in the 79th minute.

References

External links
 
 Profile by Russian Football National League
 

2000 births
Sportspeople from Perm, Russia
Living people
Russian footballers
Association football midfielders
FC Amkar Perm players
FC Rubin Kazan players
FC Fakel Voronezh players
FC SKA Rostov-on-Don players
Russian First League players
Russian Second League players